My Heart Calls You is a 1934 German musical film directed by Carmine Gallone and starring Jan Kiepura, Mártha Eggerth and Paul Kemp.  Separate English-language (My Heart is Calling) and French-language versions (Mon cœur t'appelle) were made, both also directed by Gallone.

The film's sets were designed by the art directors Kurt Herlth and Werner Schlichting.

Cast

References

Bibliography 
 Von Dassanowsky, Robert. Screening Transcendence: Film Under Austrofascism and the Hollywood Hope, 1933-1938. Indiana University Press, 2018

External links

1934 musical films
German musical films
Films of Nazi Germany
Films directed by Carmine Gallone
Films produced by Arnold Pressburger
UFA GmbH films
German multilingual films
German black-and-white films
Cine-Allianz films
1934 multilingual films
Films scored by Robert Stolz
1930s German films